This is a list of DC Comics characters that appear in the Flashpoint reality.

Major characters
 The Flash – Barry Allen is the main character of Flashpoint and is one of the few characters who remembers the original timeline. Despite being from the original timeline, Barry's personal history is different: Barry initially does not have his super-speed or his secret identity as the Flash; his mother is alive and; he has no relationship with Iris West. Despite having memories from the initial timeline, Barry's memories change sporadically throughout the series, causing him to recall the events of the Flashpoint timeline such as Aquaman's flooding of Europe and Wonder Woman's conquest of England. With the aid of Batman, Barry manages to convince various heroes and villains to collaborate in stopping Aquaman and Wonder Woman from escalating their conflict into a world war. However, during the heroes' final assault on the Amazonian kingdom, Barry's efforts are almost proven futile, as Professor Zoom appears in the wake of the battle, taunting him due to his inability to prevent Zoom's manipulations from taking effect. Thawne then reveals to the Flash that the entire Flashpoint timeline is actually the result of Barry's attempt to prevent Zoom from murdering his mother, and that Zoom now has the ability to kill the Flash at his own leisure without negating his own existence. After learning his inadvertent role in the creation of the Flashpoint timeline, Barry tries to set things right by trying to stop his younger self from changing history. However, the cursed immortal Pandora takes advantage of the situations and creates another alternate timeline slightly different from the original, and Barry fails to realize it.
 Reverse-Flash – Professor Eobard "Zoom" Thawne, the Reverse-Flash, serves as a red herring of the Flashpoint timeline, and, unlike Barry, the Reverse-Flash still has his powers at their fullest. Eobard constantly toys with Barry by speaking to Barry's mother while running at super-speed and replacing the costume inside the Flash's ring with a Reverse-Flash costume. He is revealed to have caused tragedy in Barry's life after realizing that preventing Barry from becoming the Flash would wipe out his own existence. In the penultimate issue, Reverse-Flash appears before the Flash during the battle between the Amazons and the Atlanteans. He then reveals to Barry that the Flashpoint timeline was actually created by Barry himself, after he traveled back in time to stop Eobard from killing his mother. According to Zoom, these actions transformed him into a living paradox, no longer requiring Barry to exist, and allowing him to kill the Flash without erasing his own existence. Zoom continues to taunt Barry with this knowledge until he is stabbed in the back by an Amazonian sword and killed by Batman. He later returns as an alternate timeline version, before his pre-Flashpoint memories are restored.
 Booster Gold – When Earth and the rest of the universe entered into an alternate timeline as the result of the feud between the Flash and the Reverse-Flash, Booster Gold and Skeets awaken and are the only ones who remember the original timeline. Booster Gold travels to Coast City, but the U.S. soldiers attack him mistaking him to be an Atlantean threat. Skeets is damaged when Booster Gold is attacked by the military's Project Six, which is revealed to be Doomsday. During the battle in Coast City, Booster Gold discovers that Doomsday is controlled by General Nathaniel Adam. Booster Gold then escapes from Doomsday and then saves a woman named Alexandra Gianopoulos from Doomsday's attack. Booster Gold learns the timeline has been changed, suspecting that Eobard Thawne was behind it. Alexandra and Booster Gold split up, but she secretly has powers allowing her to take others' powers and follows him. Later, Booster Gold flies to Gotham City when Doomsday attacks him. General Adam's control link is destroyed by Alexandra in an attempt to rescue Booster Gold. During the fight, Doomsday beats Booster Gold nearly to death, but he is rescued by Alexandra. Booster Gold tries to prevent Doomsday from killing innocent people, and manages to put Doomsday's helmet back on. Doomsday's control is restored to General Adam, who grabs Booster, hoping to kill him. Fortunately, General Adam takes Booster Gold back to the base for interrogation, allowing Booster Gold to escape when the sight of "Project Superman" causes Doomsday's true personality to resurface again. Alexandra manages to defeat Doomsday by using the control helmet to make Doomsday tear himself apart, subsequently asking Booster Gold to take her with him when he restores history to normal. However, Alexandra subsequently sacrifices herself to save Booster Gold from an Atlantean attack, leaving Booster Gold to return to the Vanishing Point as history resets itself without any clear memory of his time in the Flashpoint universe.
 Kid Flash – Bart Allen wakes up in the 31st century in Brainiac's stasis pod chamber without his super-speed. After failing to avoid being recaptured by Brainiac, he is confronted by a female Hot Pursuit and escapes with her help. Hot Pursuit reveals herself to be Patty Spivot, Barry Allen's assistant. Kid Flash learns that Patty stole Hot Pursuit's motorcycle and has taken his place. Bart allows himself to be recaptured by Brainiac and is placed into a statis pod, destroying Brainiac's security program from the inside. Patty holds off Brainiac and breaks an energy projector, which returns Bart's super-speed to him. Bart then runs through time to the 21st century, and promises Patty that he will return and rescue her. However, Bart's body transforms into the Black Flash, causing him to kill the speedsters Max Mercury, Jay Garrick, and Wally West. Bart reverts from the Black Flash and meets Barry, where he realizes that the Speed Force is encased in him. Bart is transformed into the living embodiment of the Speed Force's light, or the "White Flash", and he gives Barry his power and tells him to save the world.

Heroes
 Abin Sur – As the "Blackest Night" falls across the universe, Abin Sur, or Green Lantern of Sector 2814, is dispatched to Earth by the Guardians of the Universe with the mission to retrieve the White Entity and bring it back to Oa. While reaching planet Earth, Abin Sur's ship is damaged by a laser that he is forced to crash on the land. Survived, he is approached by Hal Jordan, but he is subsequently taken into custody by Cyborg and the U.S. government to be questioned about his reasons for being on Earth. Although he initially agrees to work with the Earth's heroes to deal with the Amazon/Atlantean War, he declines later on when Batman refuses to join. He is attacked by Sinestro, who reveals that he has learned of the prophecy of the Flashpoint as well as the original world that existed before this one. Sinestro plans to use the Flash to change the history to his own liking and cuts off Abin Sur's hand, severing his connection with his ring. The ring then flies onto Abin Sur's other hand, and he manages to defeat and imprison Sinestro. The Guardians then contact Abin Sur, demanding that he bring the Entity to them, yet refusing to listen to Sinestro's talk of the Flashpoint. They discharge Abin Sur from the Corps, telling him that his ring will find a new wielder when it runs out of power. Abin joins the battle in Europe when a cataclysmic earthquake starts. He dives into the crevice just before his ring runs out of power. The Entity then bonds with Abin Sur and he sees a vision of his sister telling him to truly experience life rather than just living it. Abin Sur is then given the power of the White Lantern and flies into space where he attempts to heal the damage done to the Earth.
 Batman – Thomas Wayne is the Batman of the Flashpoint reality. Having long abandoned practicing medicine, Thomas Wayne runs Wayne Casinos and has taken up the identity of Batman. On the other hand, Batman in the Flashpoint timeline is an unhinged vigilante who dispenses murderous justice on the streets of Gotham and works out of an underequiped Batcave under the decaying ruins of Wayne Manor. He also has the gun that Joe Chill used to shoot his son as a trophy, indicating that Wayne had gotten his revenge on Bruce Wayne's murder. Wayne has brought gambling into Gotham as a means of controlling and strategically eliminating crime within the city, and he is also seen working with Oswald Cobblepot. Subsequently, he has killed the Flashpoint versions of Killer Croc, Hush, Poison Ivy, and Scarecrow. With Bruce Wayne dying in his and his wife's place, Thomas becomes the Batman. Judge Harvey Dent asks Thomas to save his children, who have been kidnapped by the Joker. Thomas later meets Barry Allen and learns that as a result of the Reverse-Flash's manipulations, an alternate timeline was created. Upon finding out that Bruce originally survived the mugging instead of him and his wife, Batman allies himself with Barry in a quest to search and defeat Zoom to restore the timeline and bring his son back to life, regardless the cost of his own. While Allen is recovering in the Batcave after the first attempt to restore his speed, Thomas resumes locating the Joker with Police Chief James Gordon. Later, Batman sees the footage of the Joker murdering Gordon and confronts the Joker in Wayne Manor, revealing her to be his wife Martha. It is revealed that after Bruce's death, Martha disfigured her face after being driven mad by the loss of her child. Later on, Batman resumes in pursuing his wife after he successfully saves one of Dent's children. In the final battle, Batman reveals of what he has learned from the Flash to the Joker; that he and his wife were supposed to die that night at Crime Alley and how they are alive now. Thomas promises her that he would do everything it takes just to bring their son back to life. When Martha asks her husband of what Bruce was like after they have died, Thomas reluctantly reveals that their son would become Batman. Knowing the sufferings her son would endure after their deaths puts Martha further into madness, and she falls to her demise in the Batcave. Batman later aids Barry Allen in his attempt to lead the world's remaining heroes and villains in preventing the Amazons and Atlanteans from starting a world war. In the climax of the series, Batman manages to kill Professor Zoom by stabbing him with an Amazonian sword. Before the Flash runs to stop his younger self from altering the timeline, Thomas thanks him for all he has done and gives Barry a letter addressed to his son. After the timeline had reset, Bruce Wayne placed his father's letter in a display case at the Batcave after reading it.
 Captain Thunder – The Marvel Family of the Flashpoint timeline consists of six children who were caught on a subway car that took them to the Rock of Eternity. As a result, each of the youths were given a different one of the wizard's attributes, and go by the name "S!H!A!Z!A!M!". The six children possess the collective ability to turn into Captain Thunder, this timeline's version of Captain Marvel. While the children are in their foster home in Fawcett City, they are approached by Cyborg, Flash, Batman, Enchantress, and Element Woman. Billy is swayed to the heroes' cause since he is able to use his abilities to sift through the Flash's memories and see himself as Captain Marvel back in the proper, more heroic universe. After hearing about a massive battle between Aquaman's Atlantean army and Wonder Woman's Amazonian forces, the kids transform into Captain Thunder and accompany the other heroes to the battlefield in a last-ditch effort to stop the war. Captain Thunder briefly fights Wonder Woman to a draw before being transformed back into the six children by Enchantress who is revealed to be a spy working for the Amazons. Before the kids can reform Captain Thunder, Billy is stabbed by Penthesileia killing him. The six children include:
 Billy Batson – The De facto leader of S!H!A!Z!A!M! who possesses the courage of Achilles.
 Mary Batson - Sister of Billy Batson who possesses the stamina of Atlas.
 Freddy Freeman - Friend of Billy and Mary Batson, who possesses the power of Zeus. He is crippled in this timeline and walks with the aid of a pair of canes.
 Eugene Choi - An Asian-American boy who possesses the wisdom of Solomon.
 Pedro Peña - An overweight Latino boy who possesses the strength of Hercules.
 Darla Dudley - An African-American girl who possesses the speed of Mercury.
 Citizen Cold – Leonard Snart a.k.a. Citizen Cold is the local hero of Central City. Citizen Cold, much like his DC Universe counterpart, is mainly motivated by money and women. He is using his superhero identity as a way to gain celebrity status in his fights against supervillains. Despite Citizen Cold's brutal treatment of his foes, the people of Central City widely admire him to the extent of giving him the key to the city multiple times and building a museum in his honor, similar to the Flash's own museum. Also like the Flash, Citizen Cold's main enemies are mostly members of the Rogues, such as the Pied Piper, and it is implied that he has killed Miss Alchemy. Later, Citizen Cold is contacted by the heroes of Earth and attends a meeting that Cyborg has arranged to talk about the possibility of creating a group of heroes to deal with the Amazon/Atlantean War. When Batman refuses to join, Citizen Cold declines as well. After, Citizen Cold defeats Mr. Freeze and kills him, he returns home to see a news report that his sister Lisa has been arrested for killing their brutal father. When Wally West discovers Citizen Cold's true identity, that of a former low-level criminal, Citizen Cold confronts him before he can reveal this information and freezes Wally in a block of ice. Later, Citizen Cold invites Iris West to dinner, but it is interrupted by calls saying that his sister Lisa has been kidnapped by the Rogues. Citizen Cold tries to rescue Lisa, but the Rogues attack him in revenge for what he has done. Citizen Cold is too late and Lisa is killed. When he confronts Iris after being injured while escaping, Iris brings him to her home. After he recovers, he gives her a key to his penthouse and an offer to join him when he leaves Central City. He then goes after the Rogues, killing them all for the murder of his sister. When he returns home, he is confronted by Iris and the Pied Piper, who had revealed to her his murder of Wally. Citizen Cold attempts to kill the Pied Piper, but Iris uses one of his own weapons to freeze Citizen Cold in a block of ice, just as he did to Wally.
 Creatures of the Unknown – Lt. Matthew Shrieve was ambushed by Nazi soldiers, but then saved by Frankenstein. Later, Shrieve and Frankenstein are invited by Project M to join the Creature of the Unknown. Led raid with the Creatures, Frankenstein personally killed Adolf Hitler. After the end of World War II, Project M is deemed obsolete by Robert Crane's government services. Frankenstein refuses to accept, but is subdued and put into stasis by the G.I. Robot. Later, Frankenstein and the Creatures are revived and escape from the lab facility where they are imprisoned for 65 years. General Nathan Adam then contacts Shrieve's granddaughter Miranda to hunt down the Creatures. Frankenstein and the Creatures subsequently travel to Gotham City, where Dr. Mazursky last lived and find his cabin, only to learn he has moved to Romania. The group is then ambushed by Miranda, along with the G.I. Robot and a platoon of soldiers. Miranda tells them that her grandfather attempted to assemble a second incarnation of the Creatures of the Unknown, consisting of Solomon Grundy, Man-Bat and Doctor Phosphorus, who revolted and killed him and his family. Miranda blames the monsters for ruining her life. Velcoro saved Frankenstein from the G.I. Robot and Miranda shot Griffith with silver. The team is then saved by Bride, Frankenstein's wife who is still alive. After Miranda is taken captive, Bride of Frankenstein explains to the Creatures of the Unknown that she is working as an agent of S.H.A.D.E. She then reveals to Miranda that the second Creatures of the Unknown had been working for General Sam Lane, who is responsible for the deaths of Miranda's family. Later, the Creatures travel to Romania where they find a small village populated by monsters. The village is then attacked by a giant G.I. Robot. Frankenstein and Bride of Frankenstein combat the G.I. Robot while Miranda helps Nina attend to Griffith's wounds. She also suggests the nearby castle where Dr. Mazursky is alive, who is then reunited with his daughter. Mazursky explains that the village's inhabitants were peaceful and that they were the basis for creating the Creatures of the Unknown. When Project M is deemed obsolete, Dr. Mazursky escapes and returns to the village for eternal life. After Frankenstein and Bride of Frankenstein destroy the G.I. Robot, Velcoro dies from the sunrise, while Griffith is returned to being human again and develops a relationship with Nina. Frankenstein, Bride of Frankenstein, and Miranda depart from the Creature Commandos and participate in the Atlantean/Amazon War.
 Cyborg – Victor Stone is America's greatest superhero. Cyborg is attempting to amass a superhero resistance against Aquaman and Wonder Woman's forces. However, the heroes he approaches all refuse after Batman declines. Afterwards, Cyborg is seen talking with the President in his headquarters in Detroit. The President states that Steve Trevor sent a signal to the resistance but was intercepted by a traitor among the heroes that Cyborg tried to recruit and suspicion led to the Outsider. Later, Cyborg is called by Batman and the Flash for help in tracking down "Project: Superman", the government branch responsible for 'raising' Superman after his rocket destroyed Metropolis upon its arrival. They and Cyborg agree to join the cause to stop Wonder Woman and Aquaman, but only if Batman gets to choose whom to recruit. Cyborg agrees as long as he comes with them. The three sneak into the government underground bunkers and the group comes across a giant vault door bearing the Superman logo. Cyborg opens the door and sees a weakened Kal-El. With the arrival of guards, they're forced to escape, Kal-El's powers begin to manifest and he flies off, leaving them at the hands of the guards. While they are fending off the guards, they are rescued by Element Woman. Later, Cyborg and other heroes arrive at the Marvel Family's place, helping the Flash from drastically forgetting his memories. After the Flash has recovered, he asks them to stop the Atlantean/Amazon war from casualties, although Cyborg and the heroes are not willing to unless Batman wants to join them; Cyborg explains to him that they believe Batman is invincible. However, the Flash convinces him that no one is invincible and the group of heroes agree to join the Flash. The heroes arrive at New Themyscira to stop the Atlantean/Amazon War, and the Flash tells Cyborg to find Aquaman's ultimate bomb to dispose of it.
 General Nathaniel Adam – General Nathaniel Adam never went through with the Dilustel experiment and is consequently much older than in the original timeline. General Adam controls "Project Six"'s body, using it to attack Booster Gold as he believes Booster Gold to be an Atlantean threat. During the battle, General Adam's control link is destroyed by Metahuman interference, causing Project Six's true personality to surface. General Adam loses control of Project Six, but Booster Gold fixes the control link. General Adam then attempts to use the link to kill Booster Gold. Fortunately, General Adam takes Booster Gold back to the base for interrogation, allowing Booster Gold to escape when the sight of "Project Superman" causes Project Six's true personality to resurface again. Doomsday's attack causes the ceiling to collapse on General Adam, knocking him unconscious.
 Haly's Circus – A circus group traveling through Europe, providing entertainment for various cities and a means of survival on the run from the war. The circus group include:
 Deadman – Boston Brand is an acrobat, featured in a show alongside the Flying Graysons. Boston is still as obnoxious and arrogant as he was before he died, and he does not wish to be a part of the circus. Brand makes fun of the circus' fortune teller, Doctor Fate, until Fate gives him a vision of Boston standing over a dead Dick Grayson. Before the next show, Deadman tries to convince Dick to go solo, but Dick tells him that family means too much to him. Dick poses the question that Deadman's seeming fearlessness could stem from his insecurity of being alone. Haley Circus is attacked by Amazons who want the Helm of Nabu. While Boston, along with the circus, is running away from the Amazons, they are rescued by Resistance member Vertigo. When they are hiding, Boston tells Dick to leave his father since he is fatally wounded, but Dick refuses. Before he dies, Dick's father asks Boston to protect his son. Later, Boston and Dick are running around the countryside looking for reinforcements when they are caught in an explosion. It appears that they both have survived the explosion, but when Boston tells Dick he is okay, Dick walks through him towards Boston's dead body behind him. Boston realizes that he is now a ghost whose presence cannot be seen or heard. He helps Dick, keeping him safe from the Amazons. Meeting up with the Resistance, Boston aids Dick, who has become the new Doctor Fate, and lets him know that he is not alone.
 Dick Grayson – He is a part of the Haley Circus acrobats, featured in a show alongside Boston Brand. In a vision that Doctor Fate gives Boston Brand, Boston is standing over Dick's body. Before the next show, Boston tries to convince Dick to perform solo. However, Dick tells him that family means too much to him. Dick poses the question that Boston's seeming fearlessness could stem from his insecurity of being alone. During the attack on Haley Circus by the Amazons, Dick's mother falls to the ground in the ensuing madness. When Dick, along with the circus, is running away from the Amazons, they are rescued by Resistance member Vertigo. While they are hiding, Dick's father is fatally wounded by the Amazons. Deadman tells him to leave his father, but Dick refuses. Later, Dick's dying father makes Deadman promise to protect his son. Afterwards, Dick and Boston run to the countryside looking for reinforcements, when they are caught in an explosion. Dick survives, but his friend Boston is killed. When Dick walks towards his friend's body, he is unaware of the fact that he walks through the ghost of Boston. Dick manages to take the Amazons down with a gasoline explosion. Meeting up with the Resistance, Dick becomes the new Doctor Fate. He is aided by the ghostly Boston, who lets him know that he is not alone.
 The Flying Graysons – Dick Grayson's parents are the trapeze artists in Haley's Circus; they are famed for always working without a net. When Haley Circus is attacked by Amazons, Dick's mother falls to the ground and his father is fatally wounded after being impaled by Amazons. While hiding, Dick's father asks Boston Brand to promise him to protect his son Dick. He dies next to his son and Boston.
 Doctor Fate – Haley Circus' fortune teller. He tells co-worker Boston Brand of a vision of the death of Brand's fellow acrobat, Dick Grayson. Haley Circus is attacked by Amazons who want to steal the Helm of Nabu. However, Kent is impaled and killed by an Amazon before the circus manages to escape with the Helm due to the help of Resistance member Vertigo. Dick Grayson, who escapes the Amazons' slaughter, becomes the new Doctor Fate after using the Helm of Nabu.
 King Shark – Haley Circus' strongman. King Shark is killed by the Amazons while trying to save Doctor Fate.
 Rag Doll – Haley Circus' contortionist. During the attack of the Amazons, Rag Doll is rescued by Resistance member Vertigo. When looking for reinforcements, Rag Doll is killed by an Amazon who breaks Rag Doll's back over her knee.
 Hal Jordan - Jordan, a member of U.S. Air Force, and Carol Ferris are in F-22 Raptors entering Western European territory when the Shark attacks. Hal forces the Shark to crash his jet into Carol's jet, and both of them barely eject in time. Upon their return to America, Hal witnesses a spaceship crash to Earth and is approached by the ship's survivor, Abin Sur, who asks for help. However, Abin Sur is subsequently taken into custody by Cyborg and the government to be questioned about his reasons for being on Earth. Later, when Amazonian invisible planes invade over Coast City, Hal and Carol manage to shoot down the invisible planes and the Hydra that they drop. Later, Hal is recruited by the President of the United States for a mission to use a Green Arrow Industries nuclear weapon to bomb western Europe. Later, Hal is ready to fly on the F-35 with the Green Arrow nuclear weapon attempting to destroy western Europe at the end of the Atlantean/Amazon war. During the battles on New Themyscira, Hal attempts to use the remaining nuclear weapon, but his firing mechanism jams. Hal's only option is to fly through New Themyscira in a suicide attack, causing a process which destroys not only New Themyscira's invisible shield but Hal with it. Afterwards, Thomas Kalmaku gives Carol a note saying that Hal was afraid to say that he had always loved her. Carol sees the engagement ring with which he was going to propose to her.
 Subject One - Kal-El's rocket crashed directly into Metropolis, resulting in the deaths of over thirty-five thousand people. The infant inside was subsequently taken into government captivity. Years later, young Kal-El is found to have been placed in a government facility for aliens to control his powers for uses to make super-soldiers. Sam Lane takes a liking to him as he has become the son that Lane never had. Kal-El later makes a friendship with Krypto, who was also being held in the facility. However, after Kal-El fails to appease his government handlers, he is separated from him. Later, Kal-El was helped by Neil Sinclair to free himself and then attacks Sam Lane. Kal-El makes his way to Lane's office where he finds Sam's young daughter Lois Lane. Sinclair appears to kill Lois although Kal-El wishes to protect her after seeing her innocence. Sam Lane shows up and uses a Phantom Zone gun to send himself and Sinclair into the Phantom Zone. Afterward, Kal-El is deemed Subject 1 again and he is placed in a government underground bunker under a life sentence by General Nathaniel Adam. Sometime later, attempting to rally support in his attempt to restore the timeline to normal, the Flash, Batman, and Cyborg break into the facility where Kal-El is being kept only to find a very thin man incapable of speech who seems terrified just at the sight of others. Once they break out into daylight, Kal-El rises into the air. He then uses his heat vision and flies away. Kal-El arrives in Western Europe and rescues Lois from the Amazons that attempt to kill her. Just as the two reunite, Sinclair attacks them. While Sinclair fights some Amazons, Lois tells him he must leave. Kal-El refuses and says that he learned from Sam that they must protect people from monsters like Sinclair. Kal-El manages to overload Sinclair's body with energy, and punches him through the chest, killing him in a huge explosion. Sadly, Lois is caught in the blast. Kal-El holds the dying Lois in his arms and Lois tells him to save the people. Kal-El mourns Lois' death. Kal-El arrives at the scene of the Atlantean/Amazon war and intends to attack both leaders Aquaman and Wonder Woman in the last battle. He starts by landing fast on Enchantress.
 Oliver Queen - The head of Green Arrow Industries, a major military contracting company. He led an ex-military band of Green Arrows. Even though Oliver is an inventive genius, he steals advanced gadgets from super-villains for military use. One day, Oliver discovers his Green Arrows were killed by a female raider. Taking his weapons and gadgets to hunt down the woman in battle, Oliver is shocked when the woman reveals to him that she is a daughter of Vixen, making them targets for the super-villains looking to regain their weapons. Shocked by her revelation, Oliver had only been stalling before his daughter is killed by his reserve teams he earlier called.
 The Outsider - Michael Desai was born in Chandigarh, India, an infant Metahuman with alabaster-white skin and superhuman durability. When his mother died during his childbirth (an accident which Desai's father blamed him for causing) Desai created a massive sinkhole within a three-mile radius of Chandigarh, killing thousands of people and leaving him as the only survivor. How Desai managed to accomplish this feat and the extent of this power is initially unknown. Years later, Michael adopted the alias of "The Outsider" as he is both "outside" the law and the human race. He manages to accumulate considerable wealth through implied illegal activities, allowing Desai to effectively elevate India's status as a world power. Subsequently, he turns the entire country into a multinational criminal operation that is completely under his control. However, the Outsider has also managed to garner many enemies. In particular, after Desai admittedly framed them for unknown crimes when they uncovered some of the Outsider's illegal activities, ising Sun and Mister and Missus Terrific attacked him in an attempt to assassinate him. The Outsider then killed all three would-be assassins and set out the man who hired them. Desai is also engaged in a manhunt to find and capture a teenage electricity-based metahuman named Blackout, whom he believes can efficiently provide power in Mainland India with his abilities. Later, the Outsider was contacted by the heroes of Earth and attended a meeting that Cyborg has arranged to talk about the possibility of creating a group of heroes to deal with the Amazon/Atlantean War. The Outsider's reasons for supporting the heroes revolve entirely around maintaining his empire, but when Batman refuses to join the team, the Outsider declines as well. Later on, Desai is revealed to have some degree of longevity, as he is shown to be active in Indian criminal and political affairs since the late 1970s. In 1979, the Outsider quelled the Bombay riots by manipulating and subsequently killing the crime leaders responsible for the violence, and then uniting their organizations under his leadership. In 1996, the Outsider captured Isis in his Siberian Express on Novaya Zemlya in a bid to blackmail Black Adam into selling Desai his home country Khandaq. However, when the two negotiated terms for Isis' release, the Outsider attacked and defeated Black Adam using Durlan technology. The Outsider then shot Adam and threw him off of the Siberian Express to join Isis as his trophy/prisoner. In the present day, the Outsider is shown interrogating the warden at Bombay Prison responsible for allowing the assassins to escape. Although the warden states that he knows nothing about the prisoners' breakout, the Outsider shoots him and has his family sold into slavery for his incompetence. The Outsider's investigation then led him to Khandaq, where he uncovers an encryption key, linking Blackout to the assassination attempt. Later, Desai confronts Blackout, but realizes that the man he is fighting is not Blackout at all but rather J'onn J'onzz in disguise. In 1985, the Outsider is revealed to have kept J'onn J'onzz captive within a secret research facility after stealing Doctor Erdel's teleportation device. After studying him and learning his weaknesses, the Outsider sold J'onn to Russia, where he subsequently escaped and took over the country. In the present day, after the Outsider talks with J'onn about the past, J'onn admits to pursuing revenge against Desai for torturing him and moves to kill him. During the battle, Outsider uses a salvaged teleportation device to trap J'onn within several instances of the Multiverse. After questioning J'onn about his future assassination attempts and getting no answers, the Outsider closed the device with J'onn still trapped inside, cutting in half and killing him. Later, the Outsider returned to his base and contacts the heroes to join the assault on New Themiscyra. The Outsider arrives at the scene to join the attacks in Atlantean/Amazon war.
 Resistance – A group of individuals gathered by Grifter to face the menace of the war between the Atlanteans and the Amazons. The group includes:
 Britannia – Penelope "Penny" Black was a British Navy officer working on the Tintagel, a ship that was testing the Lionheart, an experimental engine. However, the Lionheart malfunctioned during a test run, causing the ship to teleport from the sea to the middle of dry land. The ship's entire crew was killed, except for Penny who had a metagenic trait, allowing her to fuse with the Lionheart technology and survive. To help her channel her powers, the Navy built the Britannia armor. Britannia becomes a famous war hero. When the Amazons invaded the United Kingdom, the Britannia armor is lost, so the British government sent Penny to New Themyscira and assigned her to recover the Mark Two armor and to extract Lois Lane. After meeting up with the recovering Penny, she uses Cyborg's device to locate her missing armor at Westminster. The Resistance head there, but Resistance member Miss Hyde betrays them and contacts the Furies. However, Hyde reappears and fights the Amazons, allowing the Resistance to fight the Amazons evenly. Lois and Penny get to a reserve bunker that contains the Britannia armor. Penny wears the armor and kills Artemis. She then fights Wonder Woman, taking her to one of her prison ships. There, Britannia realizes that Wonder Woman did not sanction the prison ships, the purple ray treatment and the training compounds. Wonder Woman then releases the captured prisoners, while Britannia takes them to the Resistance. Britannia and Grifter then led the Resistance and the civilians in an all-out battle against the Amazons.
 Canterbury Cricket - Jeramey Chriqui was once an arrogant con man of a university student; that is until the Amazons attacked. With the campus being invaded, Jeramey sought refuge in Canterbury Cathedral. Tracked by an Amazon, Jeramey pleaded for his life to the Amazon and to God. In a flash, the cathedral was bombed by overhead invisible jets with Jeramey being the sole survivor. In silence, all that he heard was a chirp. Whether by way of a miracle or a curse, Jeramey had been transformed, and out from the rubble rose the Canterbury Cricket. Jeramey is now the most loyal of the loyal to England and will fight to protect it until his very last breath. Canterbury Cricket assembles the Ambush Bugs to fight the Amazons, until they were killed while Canterbury Cricket escaped. Later, Canterbury Cricket rescues some resistance fighters. The heroes hide in the bush and learn Canterbury Cricket's origins until Amazons breach their hideout. During this same period, Canterbury Cricket joins the Resistance. Etrigan remarks that Cricket smells like an archbishop he once encountered.
 Etrigan the Demon - While Etrigan and the heroes are running from Amazons, they are rescued by Canterbury Cricket. The heroes hide in the bush and learn Canterbury Cricket's origins, until Amazons breach their hideout. During this same period, Etrigan join the Resistance. After an ambush by the Furies, Etrigan is seen eating Furies member Cheetah. While the Resistance head to Westminster, Resistance member Miss Hyde betrays them and contacts the Furies. Etrigan is shot by the magic arrow. However, Miss Hyde regains control of the body and fights the Amazons, allowing Etrigan and the Resistance to gain the upper hand.
 Godiva - While Godiva and the heroes are running from Amazons, they are rescued by Canterbury Cricket. The heroes hide in the bush and learn Canterbury Cricket's origins, until Amazons breach their hideout. During this same period, Godiva join the Resistance. After an ambush by the Furies, Godiva rescues Grifter from the Furies member Vixen. While the Resistance head to Westminster, Resistance member Miss Hyde betrays them and contacts the Furies. However, Miss Hyde regains control of the body and fights the Amazons, allowing Godiva and the Resistance to gain the upper hand.
 Grifter - He is the leader of the United Kingdom's Resistance movement against the Amazons. In a flashback, Grifter assembles Team 7 to battle against insurgents in the Middle East, until they were killed. Grifter is saved by Penny Black and is able to escape from the Middle East. While Grifter is recovering, the United Kingdom is invaded by Amazons. Grifter assembles the Resistance to fight against the Amazons. In the present, Grifter, Lois Lane and the Resistance are helping Penny's armor prototype at Westminster. While the Resistance head to Westminster, Resistance member Miss Hyde betrays them and contacts the Furies. However, Hyde regains control of the body and fights the Amazons, allowing the Resistance to gain the upper hand. After escaping the Westminster Palace, Grifter gathers with Britannia, who has recovered her armor and found a group of released prisoners. The two lead the Resistance in an all-out battle against the Amazons. Grifter and the Resistance arrive at the scene to attack in Atlantean/Amazon war, but Grifter is killed in battle by Enchantress.
 Kid Devil - He is a member of the Resistance.
 Lois Lane – A young Lois sneaked into the facility that her father was stationed to bring him a birthday cake. During a breakout, Lois briefly encounters Kal-El and Neil Sinclair. Sinclair attempts to pursue revenge against her father for the experiments performed on him. However, Sam traps Sinclair and himself in the Phantom Zone. Years later, Lois is reporting on a fashion show in Mountmatre when the Atlanteans flooded Europe. She is saved by the Amazons after getting to the steeple of a church, who took her to New Themiscyra (actually the United Kingdom). Once there, she learned that Jimmy Olsen, an agent of Cyborg, died in the flood while trying to save an old man. After this, she is contacted using Jimmy's camera, which can transform into different forms for concealment. Lois agrees to spy on the Amazons for Cyborg. However, when the time comes for her to undergo a near-fatal "conversion" into the Amazonian ranks, she escapes, aided by Penny Black, who is wounded by Artemis in the process. During this same period, Lois is walking through the remains of London and encounters the Resistance. Lois joins the Resistance soon after they help save her from the Amazons. After meeting up with the recovering Penny, she uses Cyborg's device to locate her missing armor at Westminster. The Resistance head there, but member Miss Hyde betrays them, revealing that the Furies have offered her a cure for her condition, and induction into their ranks. Hyde coerces the Resistance to surrender by holding a knife to Lois' neck. However, the possessed form of Miss Hyde controls her and attacks the Furies, and the Resistance fights off the Furies. While Lois helps Penny to receive her armor in Westminster's lair, Lois then broadcasts a message to the world that the Amazons have imprisoned people in internment camps, but the Amazons in Westminster's lair attempt to kill her. Lois is then rescued by Kal-El, who comes to protect her from Sinclair upon his return. During the fight, Kal-El manages to destroy Sinclair, but Lois is caught in the blast. Before Lois dies in the arms of Kal-El, she tells Kal-El to save the people.
 Miss Hyde - Bobbie Stephenson suffered an accident, resulting in her being able to change into a muscle-bound form she calls "Miss Hyde". After the Resistance reach Winchester, Miss Hyde betrays them, revealing that the Furies have offered her a cure for her condition, and indictment into their ranks. Miss Hyde bullies the Resistance to surrender by holding a knife to Lois' neck. However, Miss Hyde regains control of Bobbie's body and attacks the Furies, allowing the Resistance to fight the Amazons evenly.
 Question – He is a member of the Resistance.
 Steve Trevor – He is sent to New Themyscira to extract Lois Lane, but is eventually captured and interrogated by Wonder Woman.
 Vertigo - He lost his family in the Amazon/Atlantean war. He volunteered to rescue Boston Brand, Dick Grayson and Rag Doll from the Amazons' attack in Eastern Europe. Vertigo and the other circus members run to the countryside for reinforcements, but Vertigo is killed by a spear thrown by an Amazon. A dying Vertigo tells Dick to take the Helm and secure it.
 Secret Seven - A secret organization of magic users.
 Shade, the Changing Man – The leader of the Secret Seven. Shade is contacted by the heroes of Earth and attends a meeting that Cyborg has arranged to talk about the possibility of creating a group of heroes to deal with the Amazon/Atlantean war. When Batman refuses to join, Shade declines as well.
 Abra Kadabra – A television presenter and member of the Secret Seven. He sends a message about Shade, the Changing Man, believing that Shade is a dangerous lunatic, and then reveals the Secret Seven members.
 Amethyst - Member of the Secret Seven.
 Enchantress - Member of the Secret Seven. She is revealed to be a spy working for the Amazons. Enchantress is killed by Kal-El when he swiftly lands on her.
 Mindwarp - Member of the Secret Seven.
 Raven - Member of the Secret Seven. She has corrupted her father Trigon.
 Zatanna – Member of the Secret Seven. She is a member of a motorcycle gang.
 Traci Thirteen – Traci rescued her father from Paris before it was destroyed by the Atlanteans, though she feels guilty as she was unable to save her mother and siblings. She discovers that her father and the superhero representatives from around the world are preparing to take drastic action to stop the Amazons and Atlanteans from destroying the rest of the world. She still remembers details of how reality should be, and meets Madam Xanadu for advice. When she tries to stop the use of nuclear weapons, defeating several of the council, her father injects her with a drug and proceeds to start the countdown. Failing to stop him, Traci teleports around the world to find help. Without the desired help, Traci returns to face her father. Apparently possessed, Doctor Thirteen magically attacks her. Failing to defeat her father, Traci decides to teleport to Western Europe to sacrifice herself from nuclear weapons. Doctor Thirteen arrives and refuses to let his daughter be killed. After their struggle, Doctor Thirteen finally accepts his daughter back and apologizes for blaming themselves. Traci is impaled by Amazons, enraging her father and allowing his anger to be corrupted by his dark magic to attack anyone. However, Traci is restored to life from her spiritual connection to Earth and manages to free her father by showing him the planetary consciousness. As the nuclear countdown goes under two minutes; Doctor Thirteen flies over and uses his magic to destroy the nuclear weapons in deep space. Traci rescues her father and they teleport themselves back to Earth with the remnants of her magic and reunites with her father. It is revealed that they have both used up all of their magic.

Villains
 The Amazons - When a failed attempt by the Amazons to unite the Atlanteans have met with unfortunate demises, they ended up in a war with the Atlanteans. The Amazons caused havoc in Western Europe where they have conquered the United Kingdom where 12 million people were killed in the process. The Amazons include:
 Queen Hippolyta – The Queen of the Amazons. Her death was the cause of the war between the Atlateans and Amazons.
 Queen Diana – Wonder Woman was ready to marry Arthur Curry when her mother was killed on their wedding day while protecting her from an arrow. What she did not know was the one who killed her mother was Artemis. She and her Amazons have caused havoc in Western Europe and have conquered the United Kingdom, killing 12 million in the process. Wonder Woman and Aquaman are both approached by the Flash and the heroes who are here to stop the war. Later on, Wonder Woman fights Kal-El, who intends to attack her at the last battle.
 Artemis – Artemis, along with Penthesileia and Orm, plotted to prevent the union of Arthur Curry and Diana, which resulted of the death of Diana's mother. She then framed Garth for the murder. Later, Artemis has bombs dropped on Themyscira before Aquaman, and the Atlanteans visit Themyscira to negotiate for peace. During this same period, Artemis attempts to kill Lois Lane. Although Lois is rescued by Resistance member Britannia using the smoke grenades to escape, Britannia is seriously wounded by Artemis. Later, when Artemis and the Furies battle the Resistance, Artemis follows Lois and Britannia in Westminster's lair. When Lois prevents her attack, Artemis grabs her and attempts to kill her, but Britannia flies through Artemis' body to save Lois, cutting her in half and killing her.
 Penthesileia – Hippolyta's sister. She was the mastermind behind the plot to prevent Prince Arthur and Princess Diana's union by orchestrating the death of Princess Diana, and is in league with Ocean Master. Penthesileia is later caught by Wonder Woman, kissing Ocean Master, which prompted Diana's discovery that the war between the Atlanteans and the Amazons was a ruse planned by them both. Later, they plan to stop each of the opposing powers to make them look like heroes and be the rulers of the world. She later kills Billy Batson before he and the other kids can reform Captain Thunder.
 Philippus – One of the Amazons present at the wedding of Princess Diana and Prince Arthur. She kills an already-defeated Garth, who had been himself framed by Artemis for the murder of Hippolyta. She is found killed by the Atlanteans.
 The Furies - A group of female warriors loyal to the Amazons. However, this loyalty appears to be due to fear of Wonder Woman and the Amazons.
 Arrowette – She joined with the Amazons.
 Cheetah – She joined with the Amazons. After the Furies attack Grifter and the Resistance, Cheetah is eaten by Etrigan.
 Cheshire – She joined with the Amazons.
 Giganta – She joined with the Amazons and is shown guarding Westminster. Giganta is killed by F-35 fighter pilot Hal Jordan trying to defend New Themyscira.
 Hawkgirl – She joined with the Amazons. Later, Hawkgirl is seen aiding Artemis in her attempt to kill the Resistance member Lois Lane. Although Lois is rescued by Resistance member Penny Black using the smoke grenades, Penny is seriously wounded. Later, when the Furies attack Grifter and the Resistance, Hawkgirl pins Grifter down, but he pulls Hawkgirl down and then stabs her in the chest with a trench knife.
 Huntress – She joined with the Amazons.
 Katana - She joined with the Amazons.
 Lady Vic - She joined with the Amazons.
 Silver Swan - She joined with the Amazons.
 Starfire - She joined with the Amazons. She intends to burn the city to the ground. Starfire then went after circus members Dick Grayson and Boston Brand for Doctor Fate's Helm of Nabu. Starfire and the Amazons with her are killed in a gasoline explosion caused by Dick.
 Terra – Tara Markov is Geo-Pulse's half-sister. It was through her that New Themyscira was saved from destruction when Aquaman flooded Western Europe. Later, Terra is targeted by Siren and Ocean Master, but their plans are foiled when Penthesileia showed up. Terra joins them because her half-brother, Geo-Pulse, is used by Aquaman to sink Western Europe.
 Vixen - She is a supervillainess and former lover of industrialist Oliver Queen. Vixen and Oliver have a daughter who tries to assassinate her father, but is killed by his security team. Vixen later joins with the Amazons prior to her attack on Oliver Queen.
 The Atlanteans - When a failed attempt by the Amazons to unite the Atlanteans have met with unfortunate demises, they ended up in a war with the Atlanteans. Outside the Amazons, the Atlanteans have caused havoc in Western Europe. The following Atlanteans include:
 Emperor Aquaman – Aquaman is taken to live with the Atlanteans years before, meaning he has not learnt compassion. He had fallen in love with Princess Diana after saving her from a sea creature and was ready to marry her when Diana's mother was killed on their wedding day. He later married Mera instead, but she dies at the hands of the Amazons. Subsequently, he, along with his Atlanteans, wage war against the Amazons, and have caused havoc in Western Europe. Aquaman and Wonder Woman are both approached by the Flash and the heroes who are here to stop the war. Aquaman is struggled by Kal-El, who intends to attack him at the last battle.
 Garth – He was framed by Artemis for the death of Hippolyta on the wedding day of Aquaman and Wonder Woman. Garth is killed by Philippus before he can tell Aquaman that Artemis was collaborating with Orm.
 Mera – She is the Queen of Atlantis and was killed by Wonder Woman at some point. Her death prompted Aquaman to cause Western Europe to sink into the sea, hoping to destroy New Themyscira as well.
 Prince Orm – The half-brother of Aquaman, Orm assists Aquaman in causing havoc in Western Europe. Unbeknownst to Aquaman, he secretly had joined forces with a group of Amazons in a plot to avoid the union of Aquaman and Wonder Woman. The plot resulted in the death of Diana's mother which set in motion the war between the two civilizations. Aquaman reassigns Ocean Master and Siren to assassinate Terra in New Themyscira. The mission fails with Siren being killed by Penthesileia. Ocean Master is later revealed to having been caught by Wonder Woman after she saw him and her aunt kissing, prompting her discovery that the war between the Atlanteans and the Amazons is a ruse planned by them. Later, they plan to stop each of the opposing powers to make them look like heroes, and they plan to rule the world together.
 Rodunn - An Atlantean General.
 Shark - An agent of the Atlanteans. He attacks Hal Jordan and Carol Ferris of F-22 Raptors for entering the Western Europe territory. Shark is later killed when Hal forces him to crash his jet into Carol's jet, with both Hal and Carol barely escaping using the ejector system.
 Siren - Mera's twin sister. She, along with Orm, tried to kill Terra because of her value in battle and mostly because Siren wanted revenge for her sister's death. Siren is, however, easily slain by Penthesileia.
 Vulko - He designed a device that when attached to the King of Markovia, Brion Markov, it amplifies Brion's powers of manipulation of the Earth's gravitational field. It is through this device that Aquaman managed to cause Western Europe to sink into the sea.
 Brainiac - He is the ruler of the 31st Century Earth. He has captured Kid Flash, whom he then placed in stasis. However, Hot Pursuit manages to rescue the young speedster. Escaping from Brainiac's base, Kid Flash and Hot Pursuit formulate a plan to return the 21st century. Kid Flash allows himself to be recaptured by Brainiac and placed into stasis. Kid Flash uses his super-speed in the virtual reality access port to stop the security program and Hot Pursuit then blasts Brainiac from behind. While they used his ord energy to return the past, Brainiac impales Hot Pursuit and attacks Kid Flash. Hot Pursuit breaks the ord energy projector to allow Kid Flash's super-speed to return. Kid Flash then returns to the 21st century, promising to rescue Hot Pursuit from Brainiac.
 Caretaker - The leader of a group of pirates who kidnapped Deathstroke's daughter Rose.
 Deathstroke – The leader of a group of pirates. He and his pirates search for any sunken loot to steal in the flooded remains of Europe. He is seen in the flooded remains of Paris searching for his daughter Rose, who has been kidnapped by persons unknown. While continuing their journey, the pirates are ambushed by the fleet of Warlord and forced to surrender, but are then saved by Jenny Blitz who destroys one of Warlord's ships. Afterward, Blitz agrees to join Deathstroke in searching for his daughter and a relationship develops. Soon, Deathstroke and Blitz are alerted that his crew are planning a mutiny. They fight and kill the treacherous crew, but Sonar manages to contact another pirate fleet under the leadership of the Caretaker before Deathstroke shoots him. Later, Deathstroke and Jenny approaches the Caretaker's fleet and discovers Rose is held captive. Deathstroke formulates a plan by offering to exchange Caretaker with Jenny in stasis for Rose's freedom. However, the Caretaker double-crosses on their deal and has his crew to attack him. Deathstroke unleashes Jenny from her stasis upon Caretaker's fleet. During the battle, Deathstroke ignites a grenade at a weapon stockpile which destroys Caretaker's ship and its crew with it. Deathstroke and Blitz are rescued by Rose. Reunited with his daughter, Deathstroke sails towards an unknown destination.
 Clayface – A version of Clayface is a member of Deathstroke's pirates after being broken out of a floating prison by Deathstroke. During an ambush by Aquaman and Ocean Master, Clayface is pushed by Aquaman into the water apparently killing him.
 Eel – Member of Deathstroke's pirates after being broken out of a floating prison by Deathstroke. After Warlord's ships are destroyed by Jenny Blitz, Eel joined a mutiny against Deathstroke. However, Deathstroke and Blitz overhear this and kill the crew members for their treachery. The Eel is killed by Deathstroke with a sword driven through his chest.
 Icicle – Member of Deathstroke's pirates. Icicle aids Deathstroke attacking Warlord's fleet ship. After an attack by Aquaman and Ocean Master, Icicle is asked by Sonar to free him, which Icicle agreed. After Warlord's ships are destroyed by Jenny Blitz, Icicle joins a mutiny against Deathstroke. However, Deathstroke and Blitz overhear this and kill the crew members for their treachery. Icicle is killed by having his head blown off by Blitz.
 Machiste – Member of Deathstroke's pirates. During an ambush by Aquaman and Ocean Master, Machiste is about to strike Aquaman, but Aquaman slashes his throat with his own prosthesis axe.
 Scavenger - Member of Deathstroke's pirates after being broken out of a floating prison by Deathstroke. During an ambush by Aquaman and Ocean Master, Scavenger opens fire at Aquaman with a gun blaster. However, Aquaman dodges, causing the blast to hit his shipmate, Tattooed Man. Aquaman then snaps Scavenger's body into two by breaking his back over his knee.
 Sonar – Member of Deathstroke's pirates. After being broken out of a floating prison by Deathstroke, Clayface tells Deathstroke about how Sonar could use his abilities to detect the sunken treasures. He is not in the prison due to a superhuman trade, but Deathstroke catches up with him. He is imprisoned in Deathstroke's ship and is used as a living radar system. After an attack by Aquaman and Ocean Master, Sonar asks Icicle to free him and then tells Deathstroke that he can save him from critical wounds in return for being made second in command, which Deathstroke agrees to. Using his sonic abilities, Sonar removes a piece of Aquaman's trident from Deathstroke's chest, allowing his healing factor to restore him. After Warlord's ships are destroyed by Jenny Blitz, Sonar joins in a mutiny against Deathstroke. However, Deathstroke and Blitz overhear this and kill the crew members for their treachery. Sonar manages to contact another pirate fleet led by the Caretaker before Deathstroke shoots him.
 Tattooed Man - Member of Deathstroke's pirates. During an ambush by Aquaman and Ocean Master, Tattooed Man is stabbed by Ocean Master's spear. Shipmate Scavenger opens fires on Aquaman, who dodges the blasts, shredding Tattooed Man upon his dodges.
 Neil Sinclair - Neil Sinclair volunteered for a government super-soldier program as the government is looking to create "the hero of tomorrow". The government grafts Project Six DNA to Sinclair and over time, he gains numerous superpowers. When his powers begin to get out of hand, he is locked away deep in a government bunker. He keeps the rest of his powers a secret and uses only his X-ray vision to see throughout the bunker instead. Kal-El is later confined to the bunker when his rocket crashes into Metropolis. Sinclair telepathically mentors young Kal as he grows up. This eventually culminates in Kal setting Neil free. By this time, he has grown to a great size. Sinclair goes on a rampage throughout the facility, eventually reaching Sam Lane's office. There, he finds a young Lois Lane. He wishes to kill her as revenge for his confinement, but he is opposed by Kal. Sam Lane appears with a Phantom Zone gun and he and Sam are sent into the Phantom Zone. Years later, Sinclair is freed from the Phantom Zone and kills Sam Lane. Sinclair absorbs the Project Six's corpse to regain his powers. He then locates Kal-El and Lois in Western Europe and attacks them. During the fight with Kal-El, Sinclair's energy body is overloaded. Kal-El punches through Sinclair's chest, destroying him.
 Eel O'Brian – When Heat Wave is sent to death row at Queen's Row Penitentiary after killing Jason Rusch, Plastic Man arrives to break him out, having been hiding in the body of his cellmate Cluemaster. During the prison break, O'Brian dislikes being called "Plastic Man" when inmate Sportsmaster calls him by this name, causing O'Brian to kill Sportsmaster. While O'Brian helps him to retrieve his weapons, he discovers Heat Wave attacking the guards' control room and attempting to ram the flying prison at Cyborg's home city of Detroit. O'Brian refuses to let him destroy the city, but Heat Wave turns on him, apparently killing him by using his flame gun to melt his body. After Heat Wave is defeated by Cyborg and imprisoned in Belle Reve, O'Brian is revealed to have survived and smuggles himself into the prison in the body of Heat Wave's new cellmate, advancing on him.
 Gorilla Grodd – Gorilla Grodd became the ruler of Gorilla City by overthrowing Emperor Solovar and eventually conquered all of Africa. Despite his great success, Gorilla Grodd feels unfulfilled since none of his enemies have been able to prove a challenge to him, and the war between Aquaman and Wonder Woman has overshadowed his actions, constantly frustrating him. He decides to begin a campaign of conquest in Europe. Gorilla Grodd arrives on the scene to attack all parties in the Atlantean/Amazon War.
 Heat Wave – In hopes to become the current Firestorm, Heat Wave kills Jason Rusch in an attempt to take his place in the Firestorm Matrix, but is defeated by Cyborg. He is then sent to death row at Queen's Row Penitentiary only to be broken out by Eel O'Brian. During the prison break, Heat Wave forces an inmate to join him, after taking out another inmate and corrections officer Atom who controls the actions of Amazo. While retrieving his weapons, Heat Wave then attacks the guards' control room and attempts to ram Cyborg's home city of Detroit with the Doom prison. Heat Wave then betrays O'Brian and apparently kills him with his flamethrower. Cyborg arrives and moves the Doom prison with his sonic weapon away from the city. When the Doom prison crashes, Heat Wave attempts to escape, but Cyborg challenges him to a fight. During the fight, Cyborg manages to defeat Heat Wave and the inmates are willing to surrender. Later, Heat Wave is imprisoned in Belle Reve with his new cellmate. O'Brian is revealed to be alive in his new cellmate's body, and plans to get revenge on him.
 Joker – Martha Wayne becomes the Joker of this universe after the death of her son Bruce. She kidnaps the children of Harvey Dent. The Joker tricks James Gordon into shooting Dent's daughter by taping her mouth shut and disguising her as the Joker. She slashes Gordon's throat before Batman confronts her. Thomas confronts her about Bruce's death and informs her he has a way to rewrite history and save Bruce's life. Martha ceases her attacks but when she learns what Bruce will become if he lives, she runs away falling down a hole into the caves beneath Wayne Manor, killing her.
 Killer Croc – He kidnapped the people of Gotham and imprisoned them in the sewer. Batman then arrives and attacks Killer Croc. Killer Croc is about to strike back at Batman, but Batman stabs him in the head with his own machete. Batman then rescues the people Croc had imprisoned.
 Project Six – After being discovered lying dormant in an underground vault, Project Six's DNA is used by the government Sam Lane to create supersoldiers. The volunteer supersoldier is Neil Sinclair. Later, Project Six, controlled by General Nathaniel Adam via a mental interface, is sent to attack Booster Gold, who is believed to be an Atlantean threat. During the battle, Adam's control is destroyed by Metahuman interference, which caused Project Six's true personality to surface. Project Six attacks and nearly beats Booster Gold to death. Project Six then begins to rampage, killing innocent people. After recovering, however, Booster Gold put Project Six's helmet back on, giving General Adam back control. However, the General Adam then turned on Booster Gold, commanding Project Six to kill him. When General Adam attempts to have Booster Gold subjected to mind-crippling interrogation, Booster Gold shoots down a girder, knocking the control helmet off him. At the same time, an image of "Project Superman" appears on a computer screen. The two events cause Project Six's true personality to resurface again. As Project Six rampages, badly beating Booster Gold, Alexandra puts on the control helmet, forcing him to rip open his own chest, killing himself.
 Queen's Row Penitentiary Inmates - These are the inmates of Queen's Row Penitentiary.
 Clock King - A prison inmate.
 Cluemaster – Cluemaster is featured as Heat Wave's cellmate. He is subsequently killed by Eel O'Brian who was himself hiding inside Cluemaster's body to break Heat Wave out.
 Killer Wasp – A prison inmate.
 Meta Gang - A prison gang of metahumans.
 Animal Man - A superhero who was imprisoned at Queen's Row Penitentiary who upon being framed for the murder of his family. He was defeated and killed by Heat Wave.
 Atomic Skull – A prison inmate and member of the Meta Gang.
 KGBeast - A prison inmate and member of the Meta Gang. He was killed by Amazo.
 Psimon - A prison inmate and member of the Meta Gang.
 Shadow Thief - A prison inmate and member of the Meta Gang.
 Non-Meta Gang - A prison gang of non-metahumans.
 Black Manta - A prison inmate and member of the Non-Meta Gang.
 Lock-Up - A prison inmate and member of the Non-Meta Gang. He was blinded and killed by Eel O'Brian.
 Sportsmaster - A prison inmate and member of the Non-Meta Gang. He was killed by Eel O'Brian.
 Victor Zsasz – A prison inmate and member of the Non-Meta Gang. He was killed by Heat Wave.
 Slipknot - A prison inmate.
 Thinker - A prison inmate.
 Rogues - Assembled by Mirror Master against Citizen Cold.
 Fallout - Member of Mirror Master's Rogues. He escaped from Iron Heights and pursued revenge against Citizen Cold for murdering his friend Mister Freeze. Citizen Cold killed Fallout after he killed his sister Lisa, revealing that Mister Freeze is searching a cure for him.
 Mirror Master - Assembles the Rogues. He is imprisoned in the mirrors called the mirrorverse: it is mostly assumed Citizen Cold killed him, and he cannot leave the mirrors or he will die. Anyone entering the mirrors will die. He escaped from Iron Heights and pursued revenge against Citizen Cold for imprisoning him. Citizen Cold kills the Rogues members and then enters Mirror Master's mirrorverse without warning. Mirror Master attempts to kill him, but Citizen Cold pushes him out of the mirrorverse and he dies.
 Tar Pit - Member of Mirror Master's Rogues. He escaped from Iron Heights and pursued revenge against Citizen Cold for stealing his family's money. Citizen Cold killed Tar Pit while also revealing that his brother Jack Monteleone was dealing drugs of their family fortune.
 Trixter - He is imprisoned in Iron Heights. The prisoners are forced to shut Trixter up for the whack of jokes. He and the Rogues escape from Iron Heights and he then follows Mirror Master's Rogues; however, the Rogues did not invite him. The Trixter claims that he plans to kidnap Citizen Cold's sister. The Trixter pursued revenge against Citizen Cold for murdering the original Trickster. The Rogues, however, find out that the Trixter has been working for Citizen Cold. Mirror Master kills him by making him enter his mirrorverse, causing him to die.
 Weather Wizard - Member of Mirror Master's Rogues. He escaped from Iron Heights and pursued revenge against Citizen Cold for murdering his brother, Clyde. Citizen Cold killed Weather Wizard revealing that his brother Clyde hired Citizen Cold to kill him, but Citizen Cold also tells him that he have done it for free.

Other characters
 Alexandra Gianopoulo - A woman who can absorb the talents and powers of those she touches and whose father died fighting Emperor Aquaman. She later encounters and aids Booster Gold in fighting Project Six, who was controlled by General Nathaniel Adam via a mental interface. During the battle, Adam's control is destroyed by Alexandra, which caused Project Six's true personality to surface. As Project Six rampaged, badly beating Booster Gold, Alexandra put on the control helmet, forcing him to rip open his own chest, killing himself. Alexandra subsequently sacrifices herself to save Booster Gold from an Atlantean attack, leaving Booster Gold to return to Vanishing Point as history resets itself without any clear memory of his time in the Flashpoint universe. Before the Time Masters: Vanishing Point, Alexandra appeared and leaves the message on the chalkboard before vanishing.
 Amanda Waller - An advisor to the President of the United States who tells him that Hal Jordan is insubordinate and irresponsible. However, the President tells her that the world needs Hal as a hero.
 Ambush Bugs - A group of insect-themed heroes gathered together by the Canterbury Cricket to fight the Amazons. However, they are all killed by the Amazons.
 Blue Beetle - 
 Cockroach - 
 Firefly - 
 Queen Bee - 
 Atrocitus – A Red Lantern who is imprisoned on the planet Ysmault. Atrocitus killed William Hand in this timeline, which unleashed Nekron and triggered the Blackest Night. Atrocitus is visited by Thaal Sinestro, who had hoped to understand the meaning of the Flashpoint prophecy. Atrocitus tells the Flashpoint prophecy is a moment when the entire history will be changed, and "Flash" will then change history by using his power to reset the universe to what he believes it should be. Sinestro killed him after what Atrocitus told him.
 Black Adam - He challenged the Outsider who used technology to summon the magic lightning to change him back to Teth Adam. He is then knocked off by the train they were fighting on, suffering severe injuries afterward. Black Adam is later killed by J'onn J'onzz.
 Blackhawks - Squadron of F-35, along with the fighters Hal Jordan and Carol Ferris, are to attack on New Themyscira, but the Blackhawks are killed by the Amazons' forces.
 Black Orchid - She is a member of the original Secret Seven who had been killed years earlier. Black Orchid apparently returns from the dead to contact her former teammate Shade, the Changing Man, but is ultimately revealed to be a monster who had merely assumed Orchid's form.
 Baron Blitzkrieg – He is killed by Frankenstein with a sword driven through his chest.
 Brother Blood - He is developing drug lord.
 Carol Ferris - She, along with Hal Jordan, is on a F-22 Raptor entering Western Europe territory before the Shark attacks. Hal forces the Shark to crash his jet into Carol's jet, and both of them barely escape using the ejection system. Upon their return to America, Carol thinks Hal is not living up to his potential. Later, Amazon Invisible planes invade over Coast City, and Hal and Carol manage to shoot down the invisible planes and the Hydra they dropped on the city. Afterward, Carol is angry at Hal for taking a mission for the US government. Carol insists on joining him in the dropping of the Green Arrow Industries nuclear missile. When Hal refuses however, she goes anyway. During the battles, Carol sees Hal drop the missile through New Themyscira's invisible shield, but he is killed in the process. Afterwards, Carol return to Coast City where Thomas Kalmaku gives her a note saying that Hal is too afraid to say that he had always loved her. Carol sees the engagement ring that he was going to propose to her with.
 Catman – He is killed by Gorilla Grodd.
 Changeling - He is a member of the hyper-intelligent gorillas attacking in Namibe (now Moçâmedes). When Traci Thirteen freed the citizens, Changeling betrays the gorillas. He is told by Traci Thirteen to care for the citizens.
 Circe - Imprisoned by Hippolyta's sister Penthesileia in Antarctica for uncovering the truth of the Western European Amazon/Atlantean war. Circe is freed by Traci Thirteen.
 Congorilla – He is killed by Gorilla Grodd in the Gorilla City arena.
 Doctor Phosphorus - He is invited by Matthew Shrieve to be the new member of Creatures of the Unknown, but Doctor Phosphorus then betrays him killing his family. It is revealed that Doctor Phosphorus had been working under General Sam Lane, who is responsible for the deaths of Miranda's family.
 Doctor Thirteen – Terrence Thirteen is Traci Thirteen's father. Doctor Thirteen is rescued from Paris before its destruction by his daughter, and is a member of the H.I.V.E., who vote on using nuclear weapons to end the Atlantean/Amazonian threat in Western Europe. When Traci tries to stop this, he injects her with a drug and proceeds to start the countdown. Traci teleports to find help. When she returns to face her father after without desired help, an apparently possessed Doctor Thirteen now uses magic to attack her. During the battle, Traci teleports herself to Paris, showing her father that if the nuclear weapons are used she will die, along with 118 million people. She becomes badly injured from an Amazon spear. This snaps Doctor Thirteen out of his rampage. The two reconcile and Doctor Thirteen uses his remaining magic to stop the satellite, less than two minutes before it attacks. Traci then saves him, and it is revealed they have both used up all their magic.
 Element Woman - She is contacted by the heroes of Earth and attends a meeting that Cyborg has arranged to talk about the possibility of creating a group of heroes to deal with the Amazon/Atlantean War. She offers her help, but is dismissed by Shade, the Changing Man, who uses his M-Vest to reveal to the others that Element Woman is insane. Element Woman sneaks into Cyborg's headquarters. Later, she subsequently reappears in Metropolis, where she rescues Cyborg, Batman and the Flash from a group of soldiers working for the mysterious Project Superman. She then reveals that she has been following Cyborg ever since his initial failed attempt to recruit the heroes to stop the war, and that she wishes to help him.
 Firestorm
 Ronald Raymond – Ronald's friend Jason is killed by Heat Wave so that he can take his place in the Firestorm Matrix, but Ronald told him that it will not work. Heat Wave attempts to kill him, but is defeated by Cyborg.
 Jason Rusch – Jason is killed by Heat Wave in an attempt to take his place in the Firestorm Matrix.
 Frankenstein – Leader of the Creatures of the Unknown who departs the Creatures to fight against the Atlantean/Amazon War.
 G.I. Robot – It replaces Frankenstein and the Creatures of the Unknown after they are deemed obsolete by Robert Crane's government services. At present, G.I. Robot is revived by Doctor Robert Crane to join the soldiers to eliminate Frankenstein and the Creatures of the Unknown after they escape from the lab facility. During attacks of the Creatures of the Unknown in Gotham City forest, G.I. Robot sprung at Frankenstein and then tries to subdue him again, but Creatures of the Unknown member severed G.I. Robot's head.
 Geo-Pulse – Brion Markov is the king of Markovia. At some point, he is contacted by Mera. He is later captured by Aquaman, who attached him to a machine constructed by Vulko in order to amplify Brion's powers of manipulation of the Earth's gravitational field. It is through Brion that Aquaman managed to cause Western Europe to sink into the sea.
 Guardians of the Universe – They tasked Abin Sur the mission to travel to Earth and recover the White Entity, and bring it to Oa. The Guardians contact him once again to retrieve the Entity which Abin Sur refuses, stating that he will retrieve the Entity after he helps the Earth population against the Atlantis/Amazon war. The Guardians grow impatient with Abin Sur, discharging from the Corps. However, the White Lantern Entity chooses Abin Sur to be his champion.
 Guy Gardner - A bartender in Queensland, Australia. He is also a pacifist who overcomes his anger problems by finding Buddhism.
 H.I.V.E. – An organization whose council members take a vote on using nuclear weapons to end the Amazon/Atlantean war in Western European.
 Adeline Kane – Deathstroke's ex-wife and member of H.I.V.E council. She voted against using nuclear weapons to end the war in Western European Amazon/Atlantean.
 August General in Iron – Member of H.I.V.E council. He voted for civilians to live in Western European Amazon/Atlantean war before using nuclear weapons.
 Captain Nazi – Member of H.I.V.E council. He voted against using nuclear weapons to end the war in Western European Amazon/Atlantean.
 Dr. Kimiyo Hoshi – Member of H.I.V.E council. She voted against using nuclear weapons to end the war in Western European Amazon/Atlantean.
 Impala – He voted for civilians to live in Western European Amazon/Atlantean war before using nuclear weapons.
 Naif al-Sheikh – Member of H.I.V.E council. He voted for civilians to live in Western European Amazon/Atlantean war before using nuclear weapons.
 Prince Osiris – He is the prince of Kahndaq and a member of H.I.V.E council. He voted against using nuclear weapons to end the war in Western European Amazon/Atlantean.
 Ra's al Ghul – He is a young boy and member of H.I.V.E council. He voted against using nuclear weapons to end the war in Western European Amazon/Atlantean.
 Red Star – Member of H.I.V.E council. He voted for civilians to live in Western European Amazon/Atlantean war before using nuclear weapons.
 Harvey Bullock - An alcoholic whom Batman interrogated for information on the Joker.
 Harvey Dent – In this reality, Harvey Dent did not become Two-Face. Harvey Dent is a judge who has a wife and kids. When the Joker kidnaps Dent's children, Harvey asks Thomas Wayne for help in their search, agreeing to do anything he asks of him. When Harvey asks Thomas for his help, he warns Wayne that will shut down everything he owns including Wayne Casinos unless his children are saved. Chief James Gordon locates the Joker in Wayne Manor, and he goes in without any backup. Gordon is tricked into shooting Dent's daughter, having been disguised as the Joker. The Joker then appears and kills Gordon before Batman arrives. Batman rushes in and manages to save Dent's daughter by resuscitating her. Batman then moves them away from the Joker.
 Hector Hammond - Private consultant of Ferris Aircraft with his test pilots Hal Jordan and Carol Ferris. While inspecting Abin Sur's crashed aircraft, Hammond did not trust Abin Sur and believes him to be preparing an alien invasion. However, the engineer Thomas Kalmaku tells him to rebuke his statement. Later, Hammond designs the aircraft into the F-35, and when it is ready to take off, he assigns the pilot Hal to it.
 Hush – He is killed by Batman.
 Isis - She is mentioned by her brother Osiris believing that she has been killed by the Atlanteans/Amazons. Isis is shown to be powerless and held captive by the Outsider, who has taken over the country of Khandaq. It is revealed that Isis is held captive by the Outsider for Black Adam into selling the Outsider his home country, Khandaq. The Outsider then shot Black Adam and threw him off of his train, joining Isis as his trophy/prisoner.
 Iris West – Iris is a television reporter who investigates Central City's hero, Citizen Cold. She is Wally West's aunt, and is in a relationship with John at the Central City Citizen. One day, Iris is invited to dinner by Citizen Cold. When she asks him for an interview, he is interrupted by his emergency calls. When Citizen Cold is about to collapse near his car after being injured from his battle with the Rogues, he is confronted by Iris. Iris then brings him to her home. After he recovers, he gives her a key to his penthouse, and an offer to join him when he leaves Central City.  When Iris learns from Pied Piper that Citizen Cold is a criminal who murders her nephew, Citizen Cold attacks Pied Piper. However, Iris uses one of his own weapons to freeze him in a block of ice, just as he did to Wally. Afterwards, Iris visits her nephew's grave along with her husband John.
 J'onn J'onzz - J'onn is teleported to Earth and held captive in one of the Outsider's research facilities. After studying and torturing J'onn, the Outsider then sold him to the Russian government, after which J'onn attacked them and took over the country. He disguises himself as Blackout for undercover work against the Outsider. After a confrontation with the Outsider, J'onn's cover is blown when the Outsider tells him that Blackout has no skill. During the battle, Outsider uses the recovered teleportation technology device to trap J'onn. The Outsider then threatens J'onn to tell him about any future assassins. When J'onn refuses, the Outsider closes the teleport, cutting J'onn in half and killing him.
 Jack Ryder - He is a news broadcaster who relays the message that Wonder Woman led the Amazons in conquering the United Kingdom, renaming it New Themyscira during the war.
 James Gordon – The chief of the police and works with Thomas Wayne. Later, Gordon tries to convince Batman that he does not have to fight villains by himself; however, Batman refused. When Gordon locates the Joker in the old Wayne Manor, he goes in without any help or backup. Gordon is then tricked into shooting Harvey Dent's daughter, having been disguised as the Joker. Joker then appears and slashes Gordon's throat, who then died by Joker Venom before Batman confronts him.
 Jason Todd - He is portrayed as a former drug-addict and a follower of Brother Blood. He eventually turns his life around and becomes a priest.
 Jay Garrick - He is apparently dead after Kid Flash, who is being controlled by the Speed Force, reduces Jay's speed to give the Flash power and to stop the near-past Flash himself.
 Jimmy Olsen – An agent of Cyborg to spy the Amazons. He is with Lois Lane reporting on a fashion show in Mountmatre when the Atlanteans flooded Europe. Jimmy is one of the thousands to perish in Western Europe. Later on, Jimmy's place in the Resistance is then taken by Lois Lane.
 Joe Chill - He killed a young Bruce Wayne with the gunshot, leaving Thomas and Martha's son dead. Thomas seeks revenge on Chill for his son's death. He located Chill attempting to inject him with a drug, but instead he punches Chill in the face and beats him to death with a hammer. Afterwards, Chill's gun is in a trophy display in the Batcave by Thomas.
 Kilowog - The Green Lantern of Space Sector 674. He is subsequently killed by Nekron.
 Krypto - Skeletal remains are seen in a government underground bunkers labeled as Subject 2. In a flashback, Subject 2 is shown with young Kal-El, but they separate after Kal fails to appease the government. Later, Sam tours Lionel Luthor and his son Lex to see a captive Krypto. Neil Sinclair gives Subject 2 energy to break free and attack in a rage, killing guards and attacking Lex. Subject 2 is killed by soldiers with a Kryptonite gun.
 Lex Luthor - A young child alongside his father, Lionel Luthor, who tours Sam Lane's facility of aliens. When they are shown Subject 2 held captive in a glass, Subject 2 breaks out and attacks the guards and the young Lex. Lionel, in an effort to save his own life, uses Lex as a human shield. It is unknown if he is killed or seriously injured.
 Lionel Luthor - Lex Luthor's father.
 Lisa Snart – Citizen Cold's sister who is beaten brutally by her father. Later, Lisa killed her father with a gunshot and is arrested for the crime. Lisa is taken to Iron Heights and is then kidnapped by the Rogues. Citizen Cold arrives to try and rescue her, but finds she has been killed by the Rogues member Fallout.
 Madame Xanadu – In this reality, Madame Xanadu is still a fortune-teller. When Traci Thirteen teleported to Madame Xanadu's location, she discovers that Madame Xanadu is dying. Before dying, Madame Xanadu tells her to stop the instigated Doctor Thirteen.
 Man-Bat – He is invited by Matthew Shrieve to be the new member of Creatures of the Unknown, but Man-Bat then betrays him by killing his family. He is killed by Miranda Shrieve, granddaughter of Matthew Shrieve. It is revealed that Man-Bat had been working by General Sam Lane who is responsible for the deaths of Miranda's family.
 Mr. Freeze – He attacks the S.T.A.R. Labs in Central City for the cure of his wife Nora Fries. However, Citizen Cold attacks and uses his cold gun to freeze Mister Freeze's body. Mister Freeze tries to escape on robotic legs, but Citizen Cold froze him to death and tells him that Nora is dead. Mister Freeze was a friend of Fallout who pursued revenge against Citizen Cold for murdering him. It is later revealed that the cure Mister Freeze is searching for was the radiation produced by Fallout.
 Mister Terrific – He is attempting to assassinate the Outsider who was framed for unknown crimes when they discovered the Outsider's illicit schemes. Mister Terrific is killed by Outsider's guardian statue.
 Mrs. Terrific – The wife of Mister Terrific. She is attempting to assassinate the Outsider who was framed for unknown crimes when they discovered the Outsider's illicit schemes. Mrs. Terrific is killed by Outsider's guardian statue.
 Natasha Irons - Member of Brazilian Army who battles against the Nazis in Brazil.
 Nekron – Unleashed into the Universe when Atrocitus killed William Hand. Where Nekron and his Black Lanterns waged war, is left unknown.
 Nina Mazursky – A gill-woman and daughter of Doctor Mazursky who is in a relationship with Griffith.
 Nora Allen - Mother of The Flash (Barry Allen) and widow of Professor Henry Allen.
 Oracle - Selina Kyle becomes Oracle, having been apparently paralyzed under unspecified circumstances. She also serves as Thomas Wayne's psychiatrist, helping him deal with his rage since the murder of his son.
 Oswald Cobblepot - In this reality, Oswald Cobblepot did not become Penguin. He works for Thomas Wayne as the chief of security at Wayne Casinos.
 Pandora - An enigmatic being who merged the DC, Vertigo, and Wildstorm Universes into one after Barry Allen stops his younger self from altering the timeline. She quoted to Barry that the world was split into three to weaken them for an impending threat, and must now be reunited to combat it. Only the Phantom Stranger is aware of her actions. She is an interpretation of Greek mythology figure of the same name, who opened the pithos given to her by Zeus and released all the evils of humanity. Pandora seeks atonement for her mistakes and hopes the Justice League would help her in The New 52 reality, but her misguided attempts leads her to cause chaos in the universe once more, setting in motion of the "Trinity War" and "Forever Evil" events. 
 Pied Piper - He is a hero who has had his vocal chords ripped out by Citizen Cold, forcing him to rely on a cybernetic replacement. Pied Piper was also a childhood friend of Wally West. He arrives at Wally's lair and discovers that Wally has been killed by Citizen Cold. Pied Piper takes Wally's place in uncovering evidence of Citizen Cold's true identity. Pied Piper runs in through the sewers and intends to rescue Iris West from the Rogues, but is apparently killed by Citizen Cold's exploding ice sculpture. He is later revealed to have survived, and revealed to Iris that Citizen Cold had killed her nephew. After threatening to reveal Citizen Cold's true, criminal identity, Pied Piper is briefly attacked by Citizen Cold.
 Poison Ivy - She is subsequently killed by Batman.
 Queens' Row Penitentiary Staff - The staff members of Queens' Row Penitentiary.
 Atom - Ray Palmer lost a leg to radiation poisoning and became a corrections officer at Queen's Row Penitentiary, acting as a controller of Amazo. Due to losing a leg, Atom uses a pair of crutches to get around. During the prison break, the Atom's control is pulled out by Eel O'Brian and Heat Wave, who then force him to retrieve their weapons. After Atom does it, Heat Wave crushes his skull with his fingers.
 Amazo – A corrections officer of Queen's Row Penitentiary. Amazo is controlled by the Atom via a mental interface.
 Red Tornadoes - Created by Doctor Morrow. They defended in Japan from the war between the Amazon forces and the Atlantean forces.
 Doctor Morrow - Created the Red Tornadoes. 
 Renee Montoya - She is a bar owner and a bartender.
 Rising Sun - He is attempting to assassinate the Outsider who was framed for unknown crimes when he discovered the Outsider's illicit schemes. Rising Sun is killed by the Outsider who punches him through his chest.
 Robert Crane – He is a human scientist and works in the government services. They are responsible for shutting Frankenstein and the Creatures of the Unknown's Project M down. In the modern era, Robert Crane is still alive and now a doctor. He also helps the government revive G.I. Robot to join the soldiers to eliminate Frankenstein and the Creatures of the Unknown after they have escaped from the lab facility.
 Rose Wilson - Daughter of Deathstroke. She is kidnapped by persons unknown, where her father Deathstroke, a pirate, is searching for her. Deathstroke and his shipmate Jenny Blitz locate Rose, who is being held captive on the Caretaker's fleet. Deathstroke formulates a plan, while he and Jenny battle Caretaker's crew, and manages to save Rose. After battling Caretaker's fleet, Rose rescues Deathstroke and Jenny from drowning, and is then reunites with her father. They sail towards an unknown destination afterwards.
 Roy Harper – He is a member of a mercenary squad working for industrialist Oliver Queen. Early in the story, however, Roy and his fellow mercenaries are killed by an unknown explosion set of by Vixen and a group of anti-Queen activists. The explosion kills everyone in the facility besides him; he is remarkably unscathed even though he had been standing right next to Roy while discussing the possibility of becoming a group of actual heroes rather than mercenaries.
 Sam Lane - Sam Lane runs a facility for aliens where Kal-El had been imprisoned.
 Scarecrow - He was subsequently killed by Batman.
 Sinestro – Green Lantern of Sector 1417, and his teacher Abin Sur. The duo's friendship has become strained due to the death of Abin's sister Arin. After Abin is sent to Earth by the Guardians, Sinestro approaches the imprisoned Red Lantern Atrocitus on Ysmault, seeking information about the prophecy related with the Flashpoint. Having learned that the Flashpoint is a moment when all of history will be changed, Sinestro travels to Earth to confront Abin Sur, determined to find the "Flash" who will change history and use his power to reset the universe to what he believes it should be. During the struggle, Abin Sur destroyed his ring and imprisons him. Abin Sur then contacts the Guardians of the Universe to expel Sinestro.
 Solomon Grundy - He is invited by Matthew Shrieve to be the new member of Creatures of the Unknown, but Solomon Grundy then betrays him, killing his family. It is revealed that Solomon Grundy had been working under General Sam Lane, who is responsible for the deaths of Miranda's family.
 Tawky Tawny – A tiger and companion of Captain Thunder. He is also affected by the transformation and often seen with S!H!A!Z!A!M! being held on a leash by Pedro. It is claimed that he is the last of the great striped cats of Khandaq, but nearly everybody sees him as a house cat.
 Team 7 - An elite unit of soldiers led by Grifter. Most of the team is ultimately killed during a botched attack on a Jihadist training camp.
 David Reid - 
 Gunner - 
 John Stewart - 
 Kate Kane - 
 Sgt. Rock - 
 Zinda Blake - 
 Thomas Kalmaku - In this reality, Tom is still Hal Jordan's aide. While inspecting an alien who survived from a crashing aircraft, Tom and Hector Hammond are also studying the spaceship technology as a stealth aircraft. After Hal's death, Tom gives Carol Ferris a gift from Hal saying that he always loved her.
 Vicki Vale – She is a television reporter and is present on the wedding day of Aquaman and Wonder Woman.
 Vincent Velcoro – A vampire. He disintegrated in the sunrise.
 Wally West – Wally acts as an assistant and cameraman for his aunt Iris West. Investigating Central City's hero, Citizen Cold, Wally discovers that his true identity is that of a former low-level criminal. Cold confronts him before he can reveal this information, and freezes him in a block of ice. Wally was a friend of Pied Piper, who arrives at Wally's lair and discovers Wally is frozen by Citizen Cold. Afterwards, a grave for Wally is held by his aunt Iris along with her husband John.
 Warlord - The pirate of a fleet. He is attacked by pirate Deathstroke in a battle stealing their loot. During the battle, Warlord's crew is killed while Warlord escaped using the hovercraft. Later, Warlord plans to attack Deathstroke and retrieve Jenny Blitz, who has been in stasis since she was stolen from him. Warlord ambushed Deathstroke and his fleet and demanded that they surrender. However, Deathstroke shoots Warlord's right eye using a scoped sniper rifle. He had been aiming for Warlord's mouth. Deathstroke fired once more at Warlord's ship only to have it unexpectedly blow up. Each ship in Warlord's fleet subsequently exploded. The ships had been destroyed by Jenny Blitz, now released from her stasis tube due to an earlier skirmish between Ocean Master and Icicle, one of Deathstroke's crewmen. Jenny appears to be able to project explosive force from her hands.
 Warren Griffith – A werewolf and the remission in human form by Doctor Mazursky. He is in relationship with Nina.
 White Lantern Entity – The Entity is hidden on Earth. Concerned for its safety, the Guardians of the Universe ordered Abin Sur to evacuate it from the Earth and bring it back to Oa before the planet Earth itself would be destroyed. However, Abin Sur enters the Earth and becomes the Earth's hero. The Guardians contact him once again to retrieve the Entity, which he refuses stating that he will only retrieve the Entity after he helps the Earth's population against the Atlantis/Amazon war. The Guardian grows impatient with Abin Sur, and he discharges the Corps. During the climactic battle of the Atlantis/Amazon War, a device triggered by the Atlanteans begins a shattering earthquake. Abin Sur leaps into a crevice in an attempt to stop the destruction, only for his ring to run out of power. The Entity then joins with Abin Sur, giving him the power to restore the Earth.
 Windrunner - Wild West of the 18th century. He was approached by Kid Flash, who was being controlled by the Speed Force and then reduces Windrunner's speed, killing him to give the Flash power to stop the near-past Flash himself.
 William Hand – Revealed to have been killed by Atrocitus which unleashed Nekron in the process.
 Yo-Yo – Joker's female assistant who is loosely based on Harley Quinn.
 Zatara – Father of Zatanna. He is transformed into Zatanna's motorcycle bike.

References

Lists of DC Comics characters